The cajón de tapeo, tapeador, cajón de tamboreo or Mexican cajon is a wood box drum traditional to southern Mexico. It is played by slapping the top face with a piece of wood in one hand, and a bare hand. It usually follows 3/4 and 6/8 time signatures. In 1962, musicologist  wrote a description of its use in Jamiltepec, Oaxaca.

See also
Cajón

References

External links
Photo - cajón de tapeo
Photo - cajón de tapeo

Mexican musical instruments
Idiophones